Group B of the men's football tournament at the 2012 Summer Olympics took place from 26 July to 1 August 2012 in Cardiff's Millennium Stadium, Coventry's Ricoh Arena, London's Wembley Stadium and Newcastle's St James' Park. The group contained Gabon, Mexico, South Korea and Switzerland.

Teams

Standings

In the quarter-finals,
The winner of Group B, Mexico, advanced to play the runner-up of Group A, Senegal.
The runner-up of Group B, South Korea, advanced to play the winner of Group A, Great Britain,

Matches

Mexico vs South Korea

Gabon vs Switzerland

Mexico vs Gabon

South Korea vs Switzerland

Mexico vs Switzerland

South Korea vs Gabon

References

Group B
2012–13 in Mexican football
2012 in South Korean football
2012–13 in Swiss football
2012 in Gabonese sport